The 1977 Shellsport International Series was a Formula Libre motor racing championship held in the United Kingdom, the series ran F1, F2, F5000 and Formula Atlantic cars in the same race. The second Shellsport International Series was contested over 14 rounds. The season started on 13 March and ended on 16 October. The Drivers' Championship was won by Englishman Tony Trimmer. The season was marred by the death of Brian McGuire during a practice session for round 11 at Brands Hatch. It was the last season of the Shellsport International Series. For 1978, the series  would become the British Formula One series.

Teams and drivers

Results and standings

Drivers' standings
Points are awarded to the top ten classified finishers using the following structure:

References

Shellsport International Series